"Venezia" is a song by the Spanish pop rock band, Hombres G.  It was released as a single from their debut album, Hombres G (1985).

The song was a hit in the summer of 1985, during which it reached number one on the Spanish singles chart.  It became their second number one single in Spain, following the success of "Devuélveme a mi chica". 

The song features an introductory a cappella by Javier Molina, the band's drummer.  An earlier version of the song which appears on Hombres G's 1983 single "Milagro en el Congo / Venezia"  does not include this introductory a cappella.

Track listing
Venezia 

"Venezia" - 4:33
"Hace Un Año" - 4:02

Chart history

Personnel
Hombres G

 David Summers - lead vocals, bass
 Rafa Gutiérrez - guitar
 Daniel Mezquita - guitar
 Javier Molina - drums, a capella vocals

References

External links
 Official website
 Discography
 Hombres G: Albums, Songs, Bios, Photos at Amazon.com

1985 singles
Hombres G songs
1985 songs